Events from the year 1890 in France.

Incumbents
President: Marie François Sadi Carnot 
President of the Council of Ministers: Pierre Tirard (until 17 March), Charles de Freycinet (starting 17 March)

Events
 2 January – Steamship Persia wrecked off Corsica: 130 lives lost.
 21 February – First Franco-Dahomean War begins.
 1 March – Léon Bourgeois succeeds Ernest Constans as Minister of the Interior.
 4 March – Battle of Cotonou, attack on French positions repulsed.
 4 October – First Franco-Dahomean War ends in French victory.
 9 October – The first brief flight of Clément Ader's steam-powered fixed-wing aircraft Ader Éole takes place in Satory.

Arts and literature
 27 July – Death of Vincent van Gogh: van Gogh perhaps paints Tree Roots at Auvers-sur-Oise, then apparently shoots himself, dying two days later.
 Société Nationale des Beaux-Arts is founded. Pierre Puvis de Chavannes is president and co-founder.

Births

January to June
 19 January – Élise Rivet, nun and World War II heroine (died 1945)
 1 February – Germaine Lubin, soprano (died 1979)
 2 February – Jules Gros, Breton linguist (died 1992)
 24 March – Robert Schurrer, athlete and Olympic medallist (died 1972)
 6 April – André-Louis Danjon, astronomer (died 1967)
 21 April – Eugène Séguy, entomologist (died 1985)
 29 May – Robert Desoille, psychotherapist (died 1966)
 12 June – Théophile Alajouanine, neurologist (died 1980)

July to December
 4 July – Jacques Carlu, architect and designer (died 1976)
 27 July – Jacques Forestier, rheumatologist (died 1978)
 15 August – Jacques Ibert, composer (died 1962)
 23 August – Marcelle Lalou, Tibetologist (died 1967)
 25 September – Honoré Barthélemy, cyclist (died 1964)
 22 November – Charles de Gaulle, general, statesman, President (died 1970)
 29 November – Maurice Genevoix, author (died 1980)
 2 December – Jean Médecin, lawyer and politician (died 1965)
 20 December – Yvonne Arnaud, actress (died 1958 in the United Kingdom)
 25 December – André Lesauvage, sailor and Olympic gold medallist (died 1971)

Full date unknown
 Henriette Sauret, feminist, author, pacifist, journalist (died 1976)

Deaths
 25 January – Jean Gailhac, priest (born 1802)
 13 July – Auguste Jean François Grenier, doctor and entomologist (born 1814)
 29 July – Vincent van Gogh Dutch painter (born 1853)
 18 August – Albert Dubois-Pillet, painter and army officer (born 1846)
 19 October – Émile Léonard Mathieu, mathematician (born 1835)
 11 November – Marie-Charles David de Mayréna, adventurer (born 1842)
 19 December – Eugène Lami, painter and lithographer (born 1800)

References

1890s in France